Halaç is a village in Bor district of Niğde Province, Turkey. At  it is situated to the east of Bahçeli. The population of Halaç was 340 as of 2011.

References 

Villages in Bor District, Niğde